Çöplü is a village in Tarsus district of Mersin Province, Turkey. It is in  Çukurova plains (Cilicia of antiquity) and to the north of Berdan River. The population of village is 217 as of 2011. Main economic activity is farming. Various vegetables and fruits and especially cotton are the most pronounced crops.

References

Villages in Tarsus District